Yusuf Ahmed Hagar (Dabageed) is a Somali politician and current Vice President of Hirshabelle State. He was governor of the Hiran region of Somalia. He supports the Somali Transitional Federal Government (TFG), and was militarily supported by Ethiopia in the War in Somalia (2006–2009).

Flees Beledweyn

On 13 August 2006, after resisting for a few days, regional governor Yusuf Ahmed Hagar (also known as Yusuf Mohamud Hagar and "Dabageed"), was deposed by the Islamic Courts Union and fled to Ethiopia to regroup his forces.

Advances with Ethiopians

On December 18, Ethiopian troops were reported occupying Ballanballe in Galgadud province. On the same day another group of Ethiopian troops departed Hiran province, central Somali, accompanied by militias loyal to former defeated warlords Mohammed Dhere and Dabageed.

Battle of Beledweyne

Dabageed was returned to power after the success of the Ethiopian-backed invasion of Hiran province, culminating in the Battle of Beledweyne, fought on December 24–25, 2006.

After the battle, Yusuf Dabageed said, "We have taken control of Baladweyne and our forces are chasing the terrorists. We have killed more than 60 Islamists, wounded others and captured some as prisoners of war." Following their defeat in Baladweyne, leaders of the Islamic courts called on the Ethiopian troops to withdraw.

Dabageed proclaimed the town of Beledweyne was liberated and it was again legal to chew khat. A truck filled with khat arriving the next day, on December 26, was met with a burst of cheers.

Reprisals in Hiran

In an effort to head off additional bloodshed, Yusuf Ahmed Hagar "Dabageed," returning governor of Hiran, called for an end of three days of reprisals conducted by men loyal to him and the TFG. He urged an end to the hunting for former members of the Islamist militias offered assurances that those who were now mingled with the rest of the population would not be hurt or killed.

Replaced by President Yusuf

On 1 January 2007, Somali President Abdullahi Yusuf Ahmed declared a new administrator for Hiiran region, replacing Dabageed. Hussein Mohamud Moalim was named as new administrator, and Saleyman Ahmed Hilawle was nominated as assistant administrator.

Vice President of Hirshabelle 
On 11 November 2020, Yusuf Ahmed Hagar was elected the Vice President of Hirshabelle, garnering 87 votes. His competitor, Mohamed Mohamud Abdulle, received only 12 votes.

References

Somalian politicians
Year of birth missing (living people)
Living people
Somalian faction leaders